Walter L. Kennedy (May 10, 1920 – January 22, 1997) was a Vermont automobile dealer and politician who served two terms as Speaker of the Vermont House of Representatives.

Biography
Walter Lawrence "Peanut" Kennedy was born in Chelsea, Vermont on May 10, 1920.  He graduated from Chelsea High School and worked at Pratt & Whitney in East Hartford, Connecticut. He served with the United States Army Air Forces during World War II, attaining the rank of Corporal, and afterwards returning to Chelsea.

Kennedy managed the Chelsea Co-Op Grocery and worked for American Home Foods until 1952, when he went into business as a car dealer.  He soon became owner and operator of a Chrysler-Plymouth-Dodge-Jeep dealership, which became one of the largest car dealerships in Vermont.

A Republican, Kennedy was elected to the Vermont House of Representatives in 1960. He served seven terms, 1961 to 1975, and was Speaker of the House from 1971 to 1975.

In 1974 Kennedy was the unsuccessful Republican nominee for governor, losing to incumbent Thomas P. Salmon.

After losing the race for Governor Kennedy served as Chairman of the Vermont Republican Party from 1975 to 1976, and was an unsuccessful candidate for the Vermont House in 1976.

In retirement Kennedy resided in Florida. He died in Sarasota on January 22, 1997.

References 

1920 births
1997 deaths
United States Army Air Forces personnel of World War II
Speakers of the Vermont House of Representatives
Republican Party members of the Vermont House of Representatives
People from Chelsea, Vermont
Military personnel from Vermont
20th-century American politicians
United States Army Air Forces soldiers